The 2019–20 Kansas City Roos men's basketball team represented the University of Missouri–Kansas City during the 2019–20 NCAA Division I men's basketball season. The Roos, led by first-year head coach Billy Donlon, played their home games at the Swinney Recreation Center as members of the Western Athletic Conference. They finished the season 16–14, 8–7 in WAC play to finish in fourth place. They were set to be the No. 5 seed in the WAC tournament, however, the tournament was cancelled amid the COVID-19 pandemic.

On July 1, 2019, the University of Missouri–Kansas City (UMKC) announced that its athletic program, formerly known as the UMKC Kangaroos, would officially become the Kansas City Roos. This season was their last as a member of the Western Athletic Conference, as they will be rejoining the Summit League in July 2020.

Previous season
The Kangaroos finished the 2018–19 season 11–21, 6–10 in WAC play to finish in a tie for seventh place. They lost in the quarterfinals of the WAC tournament to Utah Valley.

Roster

Schedule and results

|-
!colspan=9 style=| Non-Conference Regular Season

|-
!colspan=9 style=| WAC regular season

|- style="background:#bbbbbb"
| style="text-align:center"|Mar 7, 20203:00 pm, WAC DN
|
| at Seattle
| colspan=2 rowspan=1 style="text-align:center"|Cancelled due to the COVID-19 pandemic
| style="text-align:center"|Redhawk CenterSeattle, WA
|-
|-
!colspan=9 style=| WAC tournament
|- style="background:#bbbbbb"
| style="text-align:center"|Mar 12, 20204:30 pm, ESPN+
| style="text-align:center"| (5)
| vs. (4) Grand CanyonQuarterfinals
| colspan=2 rowspan=1 style="text-align:center"|Cancelled due to the COVID-19 pandemic
| style="text-align:center"|Orleans ArenaParadise, NV
|-

Source:

References

Kansas City
Kansas City Roos men's basketball seasons
Kansas City Roos
Kansas City Roos